Grace Under Fire is a television martial arts period drama produced by TVB.

Wong's family

Lui's family

Tong's family

Mok's family

Po Chi Lam

Fuk Yu Kui Restaurant

Other casts

See also
Grace Under Fire (2011 TV series)

Grace Under Fire
Grace Under Fire
Grace Under Fire